Mount Gee is located in the northern Flinders Ranges within the Arkaroola Wilderness Sanctuary, and is part of the Mount Painter inlier. It was named after a mining warden, Lionel Gee.

Recently Mount Gee came to prominence in 2008–2011 because of uranium exploration occurring in an area that was commonly (and mistakenly) believed at that time to be protected from all mineral exploration.  This situation was altered in 2011–2012 when the Government of South Australia created the Arkaroola Protection Zone and passed the Arkaroola Protection Act (2012) which prohibits all mining activity in the Arkaroola Protection Zone.

Geography 
With its peak rising 600 metres above sea level Mount Gee is one of several peaks located in the visually spectacular and geologically significant range north-east of the Gammon Ranges and south of the Mawson Plateau. Mount Gee was entered on the Register of the National Estate in 1982 due to its "spectacular mass of quartz crystal and vughular, lining the cavities of crush breccias".

History 
Mineral exploration in the Mount Painter region began in the 1860s with the discovery of copper at a number of sites in the region, including the Yudnamutana copper field and the Lady Buxton mine, and numerous small diggings throughout the Mount Painter area. Professor Sir Douglas Mawson first identified samples of torbernite (a copper uranium phosphate mineral) in samples brought to him in 1910 by the Greenwood brothers from what is now called Radium Ridge. Various syndicates were formed in 1911–1935 to try to exploit the radium from Radium Ridge (immediately to the west and adjoining Mount Gee). During World War II investigations into the area of Mount Gee-Mount Painter were carried out by the Commonwealth Government, and the No.6 workings (see adjoining photo) was developed, as well as a number of workings in the East Painter Gorge (immediately to the north of Mount Gee-Mount Painter) and Yudnamutana Gorge. Sporadic exploration occurred during the 1950s adjacent to Mount Gee, culminating in the efforts of Exoil NL and Transoil NL during the late 1960s and early 1970s. It was during this exploration phase that the "Ridgetop" track was constructed. The numerous exploration tracks across the southern and north-eastern faces of Mt Gee were constructed by Exoil-Transoil at this time. Exploration ceased during the 1970s as a result of large uranium finds elsewhere and the "Three mine policy" introduced by the Federal Government in the early 1970s. CRA resumed exploration in the area during the early 1990s, focusing on the Streitberg Ridge and Armchair Basin areas, immediately to the north of Mount Gee, as well as other areas within the Arkaroola Sanctuary. Bonanza Gold Ltd pegged an exploration license over the Mt Gee area in the early 2000s. Several exploration holes were drilled into the Mount Gee-Mount Painter area before Marathon Resources took over the project and intensified the exploration efforts, focusing once again on the southern and northeastern sides of Mount Gee, by opening up many of the (still existing) Exoil-Transoil tracks. None of the uranium deposits have been proven to be economic, although Marathon Resources claim that the Mount Gee deposit complies with a JORC inferred and indicated resource of 31,400 tonnes of U3O8, potentially the sixth largest known uranium deposit in Australia.

Tenure and legal status 
The Arkaroola Protection Zone in which Mount Gee is located, is situated in the Arkaroola pastoral lease. The pastoral lease was purchased by Reginald and Griselda Sprigg in 1967 for the purposes of "wildlife preservations and conservation of the environment", with this objective being recognised by the South Australian Government initially in 1969 and again (after a long period of limbo) in 1996 with the property being granted official status as a wilderness sanctuary.

This status was reinforced with the inclusion of the Mount Gee area within the "Environmental Class A Zone" defined in the South Australian Development Plan, which has as its objectives: "The conservation of the natural character and environment of the area" and "The protection of the landscape from damage by mining operations and exploring for new resources... Mining operations should not take place in the Environmental Class A Zone unless the deposits are of such paramount importance and their exploitation is in the highest national or State interest that all other environment, heritage or conservation considerations may be overridden. Deposits which may potentially have the required degree of significance have been identified in the following localities only:
the western face of the Heysen. Ranges [sic]; portion of the Moralana Valley; portion of the Mount Hack and Mount Uro areas; portion of the Stirrup Iron Range; portion of the east Gammons and the Mount Painter-Freeling Heights area [my emphasis]." which includes the Mt.Painter and Mt. Gee areas.

Following the public outcry that resulted from Marathon Resources' misconduct in the Arkaroola Wilderness Sanctuary -- including the illegal dumping of a small amount of waste in several shallow pits and the alleged excavation and removal of mineral specimens unrelated to the mineral exploration program, the South Australian government promised to introduce legislation to ban all mining activities in the sanctuary, with the premier stating that "we have decided to give the region unprecedented protection", and dismissing suggestions from Marathon Resources that the government may be liable for compensation claims by Marathon Resources. Any and all mining in the entire Arkaroola Protection Zone is now prohibited, including Mt Gee and the Mt Painter inlier. This protection is provided by the South Australian Arkaroola Protection Act (2012).

Recent developments 
Mining company Marathon Resources gave notice on or around 14 September 2007 of its intention to apply for a mining lease allowing extraction of uranium ore from Mount Gee. To satisfy the environmental objectives cited above the application forwarded by the proponent indicates an underground mine (as opposed to open-cut) which would be serviced via a tunnel allowing access to infrastructure and processing facilities located away from the immediate vicinity of the Arkaroola area, on the plains near Lake Frome. The proposal is opposed by the owners and operators of Arkaroola Wilderness Sanctuary in which the proposed mine would be located as well as conservation and anti-nuclear groups.

In January 2008 the owners of Arkaroola Wilderness Sanctuary were alerted to environmental contamination at Mount Gee. An investigation by the South Australian Government found that around 22,800 plastic and calico bags containing exploration samples, drilling material, cardboard and paper waste, plastic jars, PVC pipe, packing and other material were buried by the drilling contractor in two large trenches approximately 35 metres long x 4 metres wide x 2.7 metres deep. Under the terms of the EWA and DEF, Marathon was required to pour remaining drill samples back down drillholes, however this is often impossible as the drillholes quickly become plugged with sample. If the samples cannot be poured back into the drillholes it is then permissible to bury them, however the sample bags and any other rubbish must be removed. Under ARPANSA regulations, any radioactive samples must be buried with a minimum of 50 cm of soil. In addition Marathon Resources have admitted in a subsequent Rectification Plan the company was required to submit that twenty drums of samples were buried in a nearby site, as well as various food packaging and personal protective equipment waste at another nearby site. There is also evidence that samples of fluorite have also been removed from the side of Mount Gee. There is no evidence to suggest that Marathon or its contractors were responsible for this. The removal of mineral specimens from the Mount Gee area has been ongoing since before the Arkaroola Sanctuary opened in the late 1960s, and collectors have prised prized examples of green and purple banded fluorite, Fluorite pseudomorphs, "nailhole Quartz" and "Cowstitite" from the outcrops of Mount Gee, aided by the continued ease of access via the well-maintained "Ridgetop Track" 4WD tourist route (see photo above).

In response to this investigation the SA Minister for Mineral Resources Development found this method of disposal of non-drill sample waste constituted a "significant breach of exploration licence conditions" and suspended the exploration licence granted to Marathon Resources to conduct mineral exploration on Mount Gee. Marathon then spent considerable time, effort and money in recovering the dumped rubbish and drill samples, which were then transported to the Hawker rubbish dump for disposal. Additionally, many of the drillsites and access tracks were rehabilitated as best as possible. However, in October 2009 the Government granted a 12-month exploration licence to Marathon Resources. On 27 October 2009, the Rann Government released a draft management Plan for the Northern Flinders Ranges, called 'Seeking in Balance'. According to its opponents this Plan allows for mining activity right in the heart of the Arkaroola Sanctuary, including Mount Gee.

After the exploration Licence was re-granted, Marathon Mining conducted low-impact exploration, including stream sediment sampling and some geophysics for a time, concluding some time before the Arkaroola Protection Act was passed in 2012, prohibiting all mining activity in the Arkaroola Protection Zone. Marathon was awarded a $5 million compensation payment by the South Australian Government. Marathon had spent in excess of $15million on their Mt Gee exploration program.

See also 
 Uranium mining in Australia

References

External links 
 Arkaroola Wilderness Sanctuary's Mount Gee web page
 Marathon Resources Pty Ltd website
 An interview with both the mine proponent and the owner/operator of Arkaroola Wilderness Sanctuary is available from the Australian Broadcasting Corporation's  "Bush Telegraph" program web site.

Mountains of South Australia
Flinders Ranges
Uranium mining in South Australia
Far North (South Australia)